Catharine Cooper (born 3 December 1999) is a Panamanian swimmer. She competed in the women's 100 metre freestyle event at the 2017 World Aquatics Championships.

In 2019, she represented Panama at the World Aquatics Championships held in Gwangju, South Korea. She competed in the women's 50 metre freestyle and women's 100 metre freestyle events. In both events she did not advance to compete in the semi-finals.

References

External links
 

1999 births
Living people
Panamanian female swimmers
Place of birth missing (living people)
Swimmers at the 2019 Pan American Games
Pan American Games competitors for Panama
Competitors at the 2018 South American Games
Competitors at the 2018 Central American and Caribbean Games
Central American and Caribbean Games competitors for Panama
20th-century Panamanian women
21st-century Panamanian women